Georgije Tenecki was a Serbian Rococo and Baroque painter who became well known among the prominent families  in Banat for his portraits in the 18th century. He is best remembered for the portraits of three members of the Karamata family. Also, a portrait of young Sava Tekelija, painted by Georgije Tenecki in 1780, is part of the collection of Gallery of Matica Srpska

Georgije Tenecki is related to painter Pahomije Tenecki of the 17th century.

See also
 List of Serbian painters

References 

18th-century Serbian painters
18th-century male artists
Rococo painters
Baroque painters
People from the Banat
Year of birth missing
Year of death missing